Louisville State Recreation Area (Louisville SRA) is a  recreation area located in Louisville, Nebraska along Nebraska Highway 50 on the south bank of the Platte River.

The area features five sandpit lakes, one of which is available for swimming.  As of 2005 the area features 223 camping pads with electrical access.

External links

Protected areas of Cass County, Nebraska
State parks of Nebraska